Manuel Montoya Fernández (born 18 October 1959) is the handball coach and manager.

He started at the Col·legi Pare Manyanet in Barcelona. He has a PhD in Physical Activity and Sport Sciences and is a professor at the INEFc University in Barcelona.

On 14 September 2018, he signed a two-year contract to coach the Romania national team, replacing Xavier Pascual Fuertes who previously resigned. In August 2019, he was dismissed as coach of Romania and replaced by Rareş Fortuneanu. On 20 July 2021, he signed a contract to coach the Iran national team.

International honours

Manager  
 Granollers
EHF Cup:
Winner: 1995, 1996

Assistant Manager 

 Qatar

2014 Asian Men's Handball Championship

Winner 

2016 Asian Men's Handball Championship

Winner

2018 Asian Men's Handball Championship

Winner

2015 World Men's Handball Championship

Runners-Up

Assistant manager

 Spain
 2013 World Men's Handball Championship 
 Winner

References

1959 births
Living people 
Spanish handball coaches
Spanish expatriate sportspeople in Qatar
Spanish expatriate sportspeople in Romania
Sportspeople from Barcelona
Handball coaches of international teams